The Women's Rights Pioneers Monument is a sculpture by Meredith Bergmann. It was installed in Central Park, Manhattan, New York City, on August 26 (Women's Equality Day), 2020. The sculpture is located at the northwest corner of Literary Walk along The Mall, the widest pedestrian path in Central Park. The sculpture commemorates and depicts Sojourner Truth (–1883), Susan B. Anthony (1820–1906), and Elizabeth Cady Stanton (1815–1902), pioneers in the suffrage movement who advocated women’s right to vote and who were pioneers of the larger movement for women’s rights.

It is the first sculpture in Central Park to depict historical women. (A statue of the fictional character Alice in Wonderland is the only other female figure depicted in the park.)  Original plans for the memorial included only Stanton and Anthony, but after critics raised objections to the lack of inclusion of women of color, Truth was added to the design.

History 
Since 2013, the Statue Fund/Monumental Women campaign dealt with the City to "break the bronze ceiling" in Central Park to create the first statue of real women in the Park's 165-year history. The campaign was run by Gary Ferdman and Myriam Miedzian.

Monumental Women raised $1.5 million in mostly private funding to pay for the statue, including contributions from foundations, businesses and over 1,000 individual donations. The statue campaign is dependent on private donations. Several troops of the Girl Scouts of Greater New York have donated money from their cookie sales to the fund and the fund has received a $500,000 grant from New York Life.

The effort has the support of numerous elected officials, including Manhattan Borough President Gale Brewer, every member of the New York City Council Women’s Caucus, Congresswomen, U.S. Senators, as well as historians, foundations, and others.

The Women’s Rights Pioneers Monument was created by sculptor Meredith Bergmann, who in July 2018 was chosen out of 91 artists who applied for the commission to create the statue.

The New York City Public Design Commission approved Bergmann’s statue design on October 21, 2019. The sculpture was unveiled in Central Park on August 26, 2020, also celebrated as Women’s Equality Day, to mark the centennial anniversary of the passage of the 19th Amendment, which granted women the right to vote nationwide.

Statue design and process 
In 1995, the artist Meredith Bergmann was working on a film set in Central Park and noticed there were "no sculptures of actual women of note and accomplishment." and 23 years later she was the sculptor who was awarded the commission for the design chosen to honor women of the suffrage movement in Central Park.

The call for sculptors involved a Request for Qualifications and Request for Proposals, in which Monumental Women invited sculptors to submit illustrations of previous work, curriculum vitae and their approach to the design of the monument in sketch, text form or both. 91 artists from across the nation applied. The submissions were reviewed in a blind selection process by a diverse jury consisting of art and design professionals, historians and representatives from the New York City Parks Department and the Monumental Women. Four qualified finalists were invited to submit models for the monument with Bergmann ultimately receiving the commission. The competition was coordinated and managed by architecture firm Beyer Blinder Belle Architects & Planners LLP.

The statue depicts Sojourner Truth speaking, Susan B. Anthony organizing, and Elizabeth Cady Stanton writing, “three essential elements of activism,” in Bergmann’s vision. Bergmann researched the women extensively, painstakingly studying every photo and description she could find in order to accurately portray not just their physical characteristics, but also their personalities. She believes it is important that a monument to them be “larger than life” to reflect the large impact that they had on history.
Bergmann worked on a tight timeline to complete the statue in time for the unveiling on August 26, 2020, the fastest she’s ever completed a work of this scale. After receiving approval for her design from the New York City Public Design Commission in October 2019, Bergmann immediately began creating the 9-foot-tall clay figures. The rest of the process, including making molds, casts, pouring the molten bronze, final touch-ups and patina, took nearly all the remaining time until the scheduled unveiling on August 26, 2020.

The sculpture was installed in Central Park on August 25, 2020, to mark the centennial anniversary of the passage of the 19th Amendment, which granted American women the right to vote.

Criticism 
The Statue Fund/Monumental Women campaign has withstood criticism during the approval process of Bergmann's statue. The initial design of the statue featured Susan B. Anthony and Elizabeth Cady Stanton holding a scroll listing the names of 22 other suffragists. This was criticized as marginalizing these 22 other activists (seven of whom are women of color) and reducing them to a mere footnote. In the second maquette of the statue, the scroll was removed entirely, leaving only Stanton and Anthony. This version of the statue was unanimously approved by the New York City Public Design Commission.

The Commission mostly issued critiques regarding the artistic elements of the statue, but concluded their statements saying, "(...) the Commission gives approval conditioned upon the understanding that, separate from the statue of Elizabeth Cady Stanton and Susan B. Anthony, the applicant will work to identify meaningful ways to acknowledge and commemorate women of color who played an active role in the Woman Suffrage Movement." However, the monument began receiving public criticism about its lack of representation of women of color. This seemed an especially acute issue given that the subjects of the statue, Elizabeth Cady Stanton and Susan B. Anthony, were co-editors of the first few volumes of The History of Woman Suffrage, a six-part history of the women's suffrage movement that, some scholars and journalists claim, largely omitted the contributions of black women. This criticism was made despite a word search of the first three volumes of The History of Woman Suffrage finding African American woman suffragists mentioned at least 85 times, often with much detail and direct quotes. Sojourner Truth is mentioned over 50 times, Frances E. W. Harper 16 times, Mary Shadd Cary four times. Historian Rosalyn Terborg-Penn said she used The History of Woman Suffrage and Stanton and Anthony’s newspaper, The Revolution, to help identify African American woman suffragists.

In the wake of public criticism, the statue was redesigned again, this time featuring three figures: Anthony, Stanton, and Sojourner Truth. Truth, an African American abolitionist, suffragist, and activist, was active in the same time as Anthony and Stanton. Many people are satisfied the inclusion of Truth as representation of women of color in the suffrage movement. However, Truth is most famous for her 1851 "Ain't I a Woman" speech, and Monumental Women lists this speech as a reason for her fame. Several versions exist, as provided at The Sojourner Truth Project and the one most commonly reproduced portrays Truth as using a southern slave dialect unlikely for a New Yorker. It was written by Frances Dana Barker Gage, nearly twelve years after the speech was given, and the statue does not specify any version.

See also

 2020 in art
 List of monuments and memorials to women's suffrage 
''Portrait Monument, 1920 sculpture, U.S. Capitol rotunda, Washington, D.C.
 Statue of Elizabeth Cady Stanton, 2021 statue in Johnston, New York

References

External links
 Monument Women website

2020 establishments in New York City
2020 sculptures
2020s in Manhattan
Books in art
Cultural depictions of Susan B. Anthony
Elizabeth Cady Stanton
History of women's rights in the United States
Monuments and memorials in New York City
Monuments and memorials to women
Monuments and memorials to women's suffrage in the United States
Sculptures in Central Park
Sculptures of African Americans
Sculptures of women in New York City
Sojourner Truth
Statues in New York City
Statues of activists
Women in New York City